Vivek Raghunath Pandit alias Bhau is an Indian social worker.  After completing education he left Mumbai and went to rural areas with his wife Vidyullata. In early stage he started developmental work helping poor people from Dahisar village in Vasai. In1982 he established an organization called Shramajeevi Sanghatana. He released bonded labors. For his excellent work he was awarded by The International Anti-slavery award in 1999.  He was also elected to the Maharashtra Legislative Assembly from Vasai, Maharashtra in the 2009 Maharashtra Legislative Assembly election independent with the support  of Shiv Sena. Presently he is addressing President of state level Tribal Area review committee Maharashtra government with the status of state minister.

References

Living people
Marathi politicians
Members of the Maharashtra Legislative Assembly
Republican Party of India (Athawale) politicians
Independent politicians in India
Year of birth missing (living people)
Shiv Sena politicians